Protocadherin-1 is a protein that in humans is encoded by the PCDH1 gene.

This gene belongs to the protocadherin subfamily within the cadherin superfamily. The encoded protein is a membrane protein found at cell-cell boundaries. It is involved in neural cell adhesion, suggesting a possible role in neuronal development. The protein includes an extracellular region, containing 7 cadherin-like domains, a transmembrane region and a C-terminal cytoplasmic region. Cells expressing the protein showed cell aggregation activity. Alternative splicing occurs in this gene.

References

Further reading